Uterus and Fire is a studio album by American band Old Time Relijun. It was released on April 20, 1999, by K Records.

Track listing

References

1999 albums
K Records albums
Old Time Relijun albums